Quality of Mercy is a 1975 Australian TV series, which took the format of an anthology of television plays. All the scripts were by female writers. The series was commissioned by John Croyston, the head of ABC TV Drama, and was produced in Melbourne and Sydney. It was followed later in 1975 by a companion series, The Seven Ages of Man.

Episodes

References

External links
Quality of Mercy at IMDb
Quality of Mercy at National Film & Sound Archive

Australian drama television series
English-language television shows
1975 in Australian television